Sir Kenneth Graham Jupp MC (2 June 1917 – 15 March 2004), was a British Judge and a Liberal Party politician.

Background
Jupp was the son of Albert Leonard and Marguerite Isabel Jupp. He was educated at Perse School, Cambridge and University College, Oxford. At Oxford in 1936 he was a senior classical scholar of University College and captain of the boats. In 1938 he received 1st Class Honors Mods (Classics). In 1939 he was awarded the College Prize for Greek. In 1939 he avoided Finals by joining the Army. He returned in 1945 to complete a Master of Arts, Oxon (War Degree). In 1947 he married Kathleen Elizabeth Richards. They had two sons and two daughters. He was knighted in 1975.

Professional career
Jupp joined the Army in 1939 and served with the Royal Artillery in France (where he escaped from Dunkirk), and in North Africa and Italy, being wounded at the Battle of Anzio. In 1943 he received the Military Cross. From 1943-46 he worked for the War Office Selection Board. In 1945 he was Called to Bar, by Lincoln's Inn. He was a barrister practising on the South-Eastern Circuit and a lecturer on economics. In 1966 he became a QC. In 1973 he became a Bencher. He was a High Court Judge of the Queen's Bench Division from 1975–90.

Political career
Jupp was Liberal candidate for the Canterbury division of Kent at the 1950 General Election. Canterbury was not a promising seat for the Liberals who had not run a candidate since 1929. In a difficult election for the Liberals, he came third;

He did not stand for parliament again.

Arms

References

External links 
Obituary, The Times: http://www.thetimes.co.uk/tto/opinion/obituaries/article2077739.ece

1917 births
2004 deaths
Liberal Party (UK) parliamentary candidates
Alumni of University College, Oxford
People educated at The Perse School
Royal Artillery personnel
British Army personnel of World War II
Members of Lincoln's Inn
Recipients of the Military Cross